Larmar Engineering Company Limited is a British engineering company and former manufacturer of automobiles.

Company History
Mr. Larcombe founded the company in Ingatestonein 1919. On July 9, 1942, it became a Limited. In the summer of 1946, the production of automobiles began. The brand name was Larmar. In 1951, automobile production ended.

Vehicles
On offer were small cars that were specially designed for the physically disabled. The vehicles were only 80 cm wide. The body was made of plywood and aluminum. It had a side door, a seat, windshield and soft top. A single-cylinder two-stroke engine from BSA with 249 cc displacement and 8 hp was mounted in the rear and drove one of the rear wheels via a chain. From 1950, a two-cylinder four-strokeengine with 350 cc displacement and 10 hp was available. An example is currently held in the Lane Motor Museum, Nashville.

There was also the Lorret model. This van had an engine with a displacement of 490 cm3.

Auction house Sotheby's auctioned a vehicle for $4600 in 2013.

Literature
 Harald H. Linz, Halwart Schrader: Die Internationale Automobil-Enzyklopädie. United Soft Media Verlag, Munich 2008, ISBN 978-3-8032-9876-8.
 George Nick Georgano (Editor-in-Chief): The Beaulieu Encyclopedia of the Automobile. Volume 2: G–O. Fitzroy Dearborn Publishers, Chicago 2001, ISBN 1-57958-293-1. (English)

References

Microcars
Defunct motor vehicle manufacturers of England
Cars introduced in 1946
Companies based in Essex